Burgk Castle ( 1403) on the River Saale is a schloss and former castle in the county of Saale-Orla-Kreis in the Thuringian Highlands of Germany which, today, houses a museum that portrays the princely lifestyle of years gone by. From the time of its construction in the Middle Ages to 1945 it belonged to the House of Reuß.

The schloss and village of Burgk lie on an exposed site on a rock plateau above the village of Burgkhammer and the eponymous reservoir on a bend in the Saale. It is nine kilometres from the A 9 motorway (Berlin–Munich).

Description 
The well preserved schloss still has the character of a castle, with many medieval details. For example, the original palas has survived in entirety, as has the bergfried and both stone bridges that lead to the inner ring and palas. Formerly both bridges were drawbridges. On the outer bridge, below the Amtshaus ("district office"), a toll tariff board is displayed. In 2016, during the opening of a Baroque wall, a medieval parlour or Bohlenstube was found, dating to 1402.

When, in 1739, the second gatehouse was demolished, a chamber and a dog were found. This was probably offered as a sacrifice during construction about 400 years ago and walled alive into the building. Today the mummified dog is displayed in the entrance behind a glass window.

The castle chapel and kitchens are well preserved. Particularly notable is the kitchen chimney. At the western end of the site is the Red Tower (Rote Turm) with a  timber-framed top in the Late Renaissance style. The entrance to the Red Tower is along a covered chemin de ronde, from which three others run along the walls.

In the centre of the mid-18th century French-style park south of the schloss is the Sophienlust pavilion; a late Baroque/Classicist style building.

Gallery

External links 

 Website of the schloss
 , docu-drama, four-part series by MDR, first broadcast: 12 December 2005, documented typical daily work in the year 1419 at Schloss Burgk under the most authentic conditions (archived)

References 

Renaissance architecture in Germany
Burgk
Castles in Thuringia
Museums in Thuringia